= ACLU Mobile Justice =

Video streaming app used to record law enforcement abuse

ACLU Mobile Justice was a video live streaming application developed for smartphones by various state chapters of the American Civil Liberties Union. It was intended to allow instant, secure video recording and transmission of interactions with, and perceived abuses by, law enforcement officers.

Since its release by the ACLU of California for California residents, other versions of the app have been released for 16 other states and the District of Columbia by their ACLU chapters.

It was discontinued in February 2025.
